Winterland is a town in the Canadian province of Newfoundland and Labrador. The town is considered to be a bedroom community of Marystown.

Climate 

Winterland has a humid continental climate (Dfb). The seasonal lag is unusual for the Atlantic coast with August being the warmest month and September closer to July than to June. February is the coldest month, especially with low temperatures. Winter lasts from mid-November through early April.

Demographics 

See also 
 List of cities and towns in Newfoundland and Labrador

References

External links
 Town Website
Winterland - Encyclopedia of Newfoundland and Labrador, vol.5, p.599.

Towns in Newfoundland and Labrador